The women's time trial class C4-5 track cycling event at the 2020 Summer Paralympics took place on 27 August 2021 at the Izu Velodrome, Japan. This combined class of (C4-5) under classification C is for cyclists who have impairments that affect their legs, arms, and/or trunk but are still capable to use a standard bicycle. 11 cyclists from 10 nations competed in this event.

Competition format
The competition immediately begins with the finals, where the 11 cyclists will individually in their own heat, compete by doing a time trial basis where the fastest cyclist will win gold, the 2nd fastest a silver, and the 3rd fastest a bronze. The distance of this event is 500m. Cyclists may have a different official time than their real-time due to this event being a combined class event (C1-3), and some cyclists in their own class may have a disadvantage over other classes (for example due to speed), thus athlete factor was used where those in C4 HAS 98.91 and C5 100.00. The time cyclist from class C5 gets will be their official time while those in C4 will have it lesser due to the factor.

Schedule
All times are Japan Standard Time (UTC+9)

Records
Women's C4 500m Time Trial

Women's C5 500m Time Trial

Results

References

Women's time trial C4-5